Sedalia is an unincorporated community in McClellan District, Doddridge County, West Virginia, United States.  The community is located along Robinson Fork, a tributary of McElroy Creek.  Its former post office is now closed.

The community most likely has the name of an early settler.

References 

Unincorporated communities in West Virginia
Unincorporated communities in Doddridge County, West Virginia